Middlemarch is a novel by George Eliot.

Middlemarch may also refer to:

Places
Middlemarch, New Zealand, a town

Arts, Entertainment, and Media
Middlemarch (1968 TV series), a BBC production directed by Joan Craft and starring Michele Dotrice
Middlemarch (TV serial), a 1994 BBC production directed by Anthony Page, screenplay by Andrew Davies

See also
 Middle March (disambiguation)